Coleg Elidyr is an independent specialist further education college and Camphill Community for young adults with autism, Down syndrome and other learning difficulties and disabilities located in Carmarthenshire, Wales.

It is a registered charity under English law, using the official name Coleg Elidyr Camphill Communities, which encompasses its 'sister site' of Victoria House.

History

Coleg Elidyr is one of the oldest specialist Colleges in the Wales, opening in 1973. At that time the college was composed of just one residential House with attached workshops. A "learning through working" ethos was established in line with the Camphill movement, drawing inspiration from the writings of Karl Koenig

Services today

Coleg Elidyr is a further education college with training facilities (residential and day placement) for young adults with learning difficulties who are not eligible for education funding. Also part of Coleg Elidyr Camphill Communities is residential living home Victoria House, which some graduates of the college transition to as a stepping stone between College and more independent living.

Coleg Elidyr offers learners a chance to develop independent living skills, communication skills and essential skills (language, literacy, numeracy and ICT). The college offers the specialist services of a Speech and Language consultant, Psychologist, Sex and Relationships advisor and Occupational Therapist to its learners on-site.

The College underwent a full Welsh Government Estyn inspection in 2014, and received a grading of 'Excellent', indicating Many strengths, including significant examples of sector-leading practice

See also
 List of schools in Carmarthenshire

References

External links
 Coleg Elidyr website
 ESTYN report

Private schools in Carmarthenshire
Educational institutions established in 1973
Intentional communities in the United Kingdom